Umut Özkırımlı (born 18 November 1970, Ankara, Turkey) is a political scientist known for his work in nationalism studies.

Biography 
After completing his secondary education in Lycée Français Privé Saint-Joseph in Istanbul, he attended Boğaziçi University. He received his master's degree from London School of Economics and Political Science and his doctoral degree from Istanbul University. He taught as an associate professor in the International Relations department of Istanbul Bilgi University, and was a Professor in Contemporary Turkey Studies at the Center for Middle Eastern Studies, Lund University, Sweden. Currently, he is a Senior Research Associate at Barcelona Centre for International Affairs (CIDOB) and Visiting Professor at Blanquerna - Universitat Ramon Llull.

The second edition of his first book Theories of Nationalism. A Critical Introduction was published in April 2010. His second book Contemporary Debates on Nationalism: A Critical Engagement published in 2005 continued where he left off in the first book and focused on more recent (i.e. postmodern, feminist and post-colonial) accounts of nationalism along with topics such as globalization, cosmopolitanism, multiculturalism). The book, co-authored with Spyros Sofos, is Tormented by History: Nationalism in Greece and Turkey marks the first sustained and critical effort to study Greek and Turkish nationalisms in a comparative perspective. Özkırımlı's edited volumes include Nationalism and its Futures and (with Ayhan Aktar and Niyazi Kizilyurek) Nationalism in the Troubled Triangle: Cyprus, Greece and Turkey.

Selected publications 
 Yumul, A., and U. Özkirimli 2000. “Reproducing the nation: banal nationalism'in the Turkish press.” Media, Culture & Society 22.
 Theories of Nationalism. A Critical Introduction (2000) 
 Özkirimli, U. 2003. “The nation as an artichoke? A critique of ethnosymbolist interpretations of nationalism.” Nations and Nationalism 9.
 Contemporary Debates on Nationalism: A Critical Engagement (2005) 
Özkirimli, U., & Grosby, S. (2007). Nationalism theory debate: the antiquity of nations?. Nations and nationalism, 13(3), 523-537.
Tormented by History: Nationalism in Greece and Turkey co-authored with Spyros Sofos (2008) .
Özkırımlı, U. (2011). The changing nature of nationalism in Turkey: Actors, discourses, and the struggle for hegemony. Symbiotic Antagonisms: Competing Nationalisms in Turkey, 82-100.
Özkırımlı, U. (Ed.). (2014). The making of a protest movement in Turkey:# occupygezi. Basingstoke, UK: Palgrave Macmillan.

References 

Turkish political scientists
Scholars of nationalism
People from Ankara
Istanbul University alumni
Academic staff of Istanbul Bilgi University
1970 births
Living people